Tha Takiap is the easternmost district (amphoe) of Chachoengsao province, central Thailand.

History
The minor district (king amphoe) Tha Takiap was established on 1 April 1991 by splitting off two tambons from Sanam Chai Khet district. It was upgraded to a full district on 5 December 1996.

Geography
Neighboring districts are (from the north clockwise): Sanam Chai Khet of Chachoengsao Province; Khao Chakan, Wang Nam Yen, and Wang Sombun of Sa Kaeo province; Kaeng Hang Maeo of Chanthaburi province; and  Bo Thong and Ko Chan of Chonburi province.

Administration

Central administration 
Tha Takiap is divided into two sub-districts (tambons), which are further subdivided into 47 administrative villages (mubans).

Local administration 
There are two sub-district administrative organizations (SAO) in the district:
 Tha Takiap consisting of sub-district Tha Takiap.
 Khlong Takrao consisting of sub-district Khlong Takrao.

References

External links
amphoe.com
Amphoe information at the Excise Department (Thai)

Tha Takiap